Alison Oliver (born 3 June 1997) is an Irish actress. She is known for her debut role as Frances in the BBC Three and Hulu miniseries Conversations with Friends (2022).

Early life 
Oliver was born in Ballintemple, Cork before moving to Blackrock when she was young. Her mother is a social worker and her father worked in the motor trade. She attended Scoil Mhuire, a private school in Cork, and took drama, singing and dancing lessons at The Performer's Academy and the Cork School of Dance. She applied to Trinity College Dublin's drama school The Lir Academy, but was invited to take a year-long foundation course in Acting and Theatre first. She auditioned again after completing the course, going on to graduate with a Bachelor of Arts in Acting in 2020.

Career
Oliver landed her debut television role as Frances Flynn in Conversations with Friends, a miniseries adaptation of Sally Rooney's 2017 debut novel of the same name developed by Element Pictures for BBC Three and Hulu. She received the news that she had been cast in Conversations with Friends the morning after graduating from drama school.

Oliver will make her London stage debut in Women, Beware the Devil at the Almeida Theatre in February 2023. She has upcoming roles in the BBC One drama Best Interests and Emerald Fennell's Saltburn for Amazon Prime, marking Oliver's feature film debut.

Personal life 
Oliver is dating fellow actor and Lir alumnus Éanna Hardwicke. She is a vegetarian.
She is currently living in Dalston, London with her sister.

Filmography

References

External links
 

1997 births
Living people
21st-century Irish actresses
Actresses from Cork (city)
Alumni of Trinity College Dublin
People educated at Scoil Mhuire, Cork